Kate Marion Hall FLS FZS (August 1861 – 12 April 1918) was a British museum curator.

As the curator of the Whitechapel Museum from 1894 to 1909, she was the first professionally employed female curator in England. She founded the Nature Study Museum, in a disused chapel of St George in the East church, in 1904.

Kate Hall lectured at the Toynbee Hall project, and gave lectures and demonstrations to local school children.

In 1905, she was one of the speakers in the Horniman Museum's series of lectures, speaking on "The life of the honey bee", "The work of the honey bee", and "Trees".

In 1901, she read a paper "The Smallest Museum" at the Edinburgh Conference of the Museums Association.

References

Further reading

1861 births
1918 deaths
British women curators
English curators